Mildred Coughlin (1892-1984) was an American artist known for painting, illustration, and printmaking.

Biography
Coughlin was born in Wilkes-Barre, Pennsylvania on July 16, 1892. She studied at Wellesley College, the École des Beaux-Arts, and Art Students League of New York. In 1924 she married the playwright Patterson McNutt. The couple settled in California in the 1930s. Coughlin depicted various aspects of life in Los Angeles, often humorously. Her subjects include Hollywood movie-making, the Santa Anita racetrack, and the Los Angeles Farmers Market.

Coughlin exhibited her work at the California Society of Etchers (now the California Society of Printmakers, the Chicago Society of Etchers, the Society of American Etchers, and the Southern Printmakers.

Coughlin died in Sonoma, California on December 3, 1984. Her work is in the Smithsonian American Art Museum, the National Gallery of Art, as well as the Library of Congress, and the Pennsylvania Academy of the Fine Arts.

References

1892 births
1984 deaths
20th-century American women artists
American printmakers
People from Wilkes-Barre, Pennsylvania
Wellesley College alumni
American alumni of the École des Beaux-Arts
American women printmakers